Different Shades of Blue is the eleventh studio album by blues rock guitarist Joe Bonamassa. It was released on September 22, 2014.

The album debuted at number 8 on the Billboard 200, which makes this Bonamassa's highest charting album, and his first top 10 on the chart. It was ranked No. 3 on Billboard's Year End Blues Album Chart of 2015. It has sold 96,000 copies in the United States as of February 2016.

Track listing

Personnel

Musicians
 Joe Bonamassa – guitar, vocals
 Reese Wynans – organ, piano 
 Anton Fig – drums, percussion
 Carmine Rojas – bass
 Michael Rhodes – bass
 Lenny Castro – percussion
 Doug Henthorn – background vocals
 Melanie Williams – background vocals
 Lee Thornburg – horn arrangements, trombone, trumpet
 Ron Dziubla – saxophone
 The Bovaland Orchestra – strings
 Jeff Bova – string arrangements

Production
 Rik Gould – photography
 Mark Everton Gray – engineer
 Erik Kabik – photography
 Philippe Klose – photography
 Bob Ludwig – mastering
 Kevin Shirley – engineer, mixing, producer
 Brent Spear – technician at The Palms
 Dennis Friel – design, artwork

Charts

Certifications

References 

Albums produced by Kevin Shirley
Joe Bonamassa albums
2014 albums